Leopold Caspari (July 28, 1830March 11, 1915) was a Louisiana businessman and politician who served in the Louisiana House of Representatives from 1884 to 1892, where he advocated the establishment of Northwestern State University.

Born in Lauterbourg, northeastern France, he came to Louisiana after the Revolution of 1848, and served in the Confederate States of America during the Civil War, gaining the rank of captain.

References 

1830 births
1915 deaths
19th-century American politicians
Alsatian Jews
American bankers
American Sephardic Jews
Burials in Louisiana
Businesspeople from Louisiana
Confederate States Army officers
Farmers from Louisiana
Foreign Confederate military personnel
French emigrants to the United States
Jewish American state legislators in Louisiana
Jewish Confederates
Democratic Party Louisiana state senators
Democratic Party members of the Louisiana House of Representatives
People from Lauterbourg
People of Louisiana in the American Civil War
Politicians from Natchitoches, Louisiana
School board members in Louisiana